Gregory coefficients , also known as reciprocal logarithmic numbers, Bernoulli numbers of the second kind, or Cauchy numbers of the first kind, are the rational numbers 
that occur in the Maclaurin series expansion of the reciprocal logarithm

Gregory coefficients are alternating  and decreasing in absolute value. These numbers are named after James Gregory who introduced them in 1670 in the numerical integration context. They were subsequently rediscovered by many mathematicians and often appear in works of modern authors, who do not always recognize them.

Numerical values

Computation and representations
The simplest way to compute Gregory coefficients is to use the recurrence formula

 

Gregory coefficients may be also computed explicitly via the following differential

 

the integral

 
Schröder's integral formula
 

or the finite summation formula

 
where  are the signed Stirling numbers of the first kind.

Bounds and asymptotic behavior

The Gregory coefficients satisfy the bounds

given by Johan Steffensen. These bounds were later improved by various authors. The best known bounds for them were given by Blagouchine. In particular,

Asymptotically, at large index , these numbers behave as

Series with Gregory coefficients
Series involving Gregory coefficients may be often calculated in a closed-form. Basic series with these numbers include

where  is Euler's constant. These results are very old, and their history may be traced back to the works of Gregorio Fontana and Lorenzo Mascheroni. More complicated series with the Gregory coefficients were calculated by various authors. Kowalenko, Alabdulmohsin  and some other authors calculated

Alabdulmohsin also gives these identities

Candelperger, Coppo and Young showed that

where  are the harmonic numbers.
Blagouchine provides the following identities

It is also known that the zeta function, the gamma function, the polygamma functions, the Stieltjes constants and many other special functions and constants may be expressed in terms of infinite series containing these numbers.

Generalizations
Various generalizations are possible for the Gregory coefficients. Many of them may be obtained by modifying the parent generating equation. For example, Van Veen consider

and hence

 

Equivalent generalizations were later proposed by Kowalenko and Rubinstein. In a similar manner, Gregory coefficients are related to the generalized Bernoulli numbers

 

see, so that

 

Jordan defines polynomials  such that

 

and call them Bernoulli polynomials of the second kind. From the above, it is clear that .
Carlitz generalized Jordan's polynomials  by introducing polynomials 

and therefore

 

Blagouchine introduced numbers  such that

 

obtained their generating function and studied their asymptotics at large . Clearly, . These numbers are strictly alternating  and involved in various expansions for the zeta-functions, Euler's constant and polygamma functions.
A different generalization of the same kind was also proposed by Komatsu  
 

so that  Numbers  are called by the author poly-Cauchy numbers. Coffey
defines polynomials

 

and therefore .

See also
 Stirling polynomials
 Bernoulli polynomials of the second kind

References 

Integer sequences
Number theory
Inequalities
Asymptotic analysis